The pale-headed woodpecker (Gecinulus grantia) is a species of bird in the family Picidae.
It is found in Bangladesh, Bhutan, China, India, Laos, Myanmar, Nepal, Thailand, and Vietnam.
Its natural habitats are subtropical or tropical dry forests and subtropical or tropical moist lowland forests.

A molecular phylogenetic study published in 2017 found that the pale-headed woodpecker was embedded within the genus Dinopium and was a sister species to the olive-backed woodpecker (Dinopium rafflesii).

References

pale-headed woodpecker
Birds of Bhutan
Birds of Northeast India
Birds of Laos
Birds of Myanmar
Birds of Vietnam
pale-headed woodpecker
Taxonomy articles created by Polbot